Andreas Jaszlinszky (September 1715 in Abaújszina – January 1783 in Rozsnyó) was the Slovak-born author of the early physics textbooks Institutiones physicae pars prima, seu physica generalis (Trnava/Nagyszombat, 1756/1761, 471 pp) and Institutiones physicae pars altera, seu physica particularis (Trnava/Nagyszombat, 1756/1761, 341 pp).

Biography 

Jaszlinszky joined the Jesuits (October 1733 in Trencin) and published his physics textbooks as a professor at the University of Trnava (Kingdom of Hungary in modern-day Slovakia), where he taught philosophy, metaphysics, history, ethics, physics and theology. At that time, the University of Trnava was one of the major Jesuit universities in Eastern Europe (and the only university in the Kingdom of Hungary), along with Braunsberg, Lemberg, Vilnius, and Prague. Publication of Physica Generalis and Physica Particularis occurred in response to a 1753 order from Maria Theresa (Habsburg ruler in Vienna) requiring every professor to write textbooks instead of dictating lecture notes, which created a surge of works by Adanyi, Jaszlinszky, Reviczky, Radics, and Horvath. Jaszlinszky became rector of the university in 1771, and after the Suppression of the Society of Jesus in 1773, he became canon in Rozsnyo. He was a contemporary of Johann Baptiste Horvath, Leopold Biwald, and Joseph Redlhamer.

These Latin physics textbooks each contain eight plates with descriptions and images of a variety of contemporary physics devices including manometers (fluid statics), lenses/prisms (refraction), and various simple machines. Coverage of electricity is relatively sparse, although many other diverse topics are surveyed, including mechanics, magnetism, celestial mechanics, fluid drag experiments, mineralogy, and human anatomy. Extensive bibliographical references are provided.

These textbooks (1750s) at least somewhat ambiguously reflect incorrect Cartesian vortex mechanics, rather than the correct Newtonian mechanics fully embraced by Horvath (1770s). Indeed, modern Newtonian mechanics (1687) was only widely accepted in Hungary by the 1760s and 1770s. Between 1616 and 1759, three years after first publication of Physica Generalis and Physica Particularis, Jesuit scientists could not publish textbooks overtly favoring Copernican models of the Solar System, although the heliocentric theory was allowed to be presented along with other theories (for example Ptolemaic as shown below in Plate 1 of Physica Particularis). However, since Nagyszombat had an astronomical observatory (1755–1773), historians speculate that local Jesuit professors would have observed phenomena that would have convinced them that heliocentrism was correct. Indeed, Jaszlinszky essentially rejected the Ptolemaic approach.

Jaszlinszky was also the author of Tractatus Theologicus de Angelis, Beatitudine et Actibus Humanis (Trnava, 1762/1769, 574 pp) and possibly Geographica (1761), in addition to Institutiones logicae (Trnava, 1754, 164 pp) and Institutiones metaphysicae (Trnava, 1755, 288 pp), consistent with how the Ratio Studiorum (1599) was applied following Christopher Clavius.

A copy of Physica Generalis is provided by Google Books. Images of the textbook title pages are also available. Each of these textbooks is worth approximately $150 depending on condition.

The plates shown below are from a copy owned by multiple professors at the Collegio Romano around 1762.

Plates (8) from Physica Generalis (1756)

Plates (8) from Physica Particularis (1756)

See also 
 Johann Baptiste Horvath
 Edmond Pourchot
 Pierre Lemonnier
 Philip of the Blessed Trinity
 Charles Morton

References 

1715 births
1783 deaths
People from Košice-okolie District
Slovak Jesuits
18th-century Hungarian Jesuits
Slovak physicists
18th-century Hungarian physicists
18th-century Latin-language writers
18th-century male writers